Volker Münz (born 8 August 1964 in Verden (Aller)) is a German banker and politician (Alternative for Germany). He is member of völkisch-nationalistic Der Flügel and from 2017 to 2021 member of German Bundestag.

Münz worked in a bank and studied economic science at Universität Hannover. His last position was head of a departement in Hypovereinsbank.

Volker Münz spoke in the summer of 2019 against a candidacy of the Thuringia parliamentary leader Björn Höcke as federal chairman of AfD. He feared a consolidation of polarization within AfD, if the prominent representative of the national wing came on the federal executive committee. "We do not need any sharp comments, we also do not need an inappropriate style." He criticized Höcke's style at the Kyffhäuser meeting. There, he had massively attacked the AfD Federal Board and asked his critics to leave the party. "He talks about unity, but he splits," said Münz in 2019.

References 

Living people
1964 births
People from Verden an der Aller
University of Hanover alumni
German bankers
Members of the Bundestag for Baden-Württemberg
Members of the Bundestag 2017–2021
Members of the Bundestag for the Alternative for Germany